Emily Charlotte Talbot (1 August 1840 – 21 September 1918) was an heiress and industrialist of South Wales, the daughter of Christopher Rice Mansel Talbot.

She was born in Belgrave Square, the centrepiece of Belgravia in London.

Following the death of her brother, Theodore, in 1876, Emily - known locally as "Miss Talbot" throughout her life - became the heiress to her father's fortune and his estates at Margam and Penrice, which she inherited on his death in 1890. She was largely responsible for creating a port and railway system to attract business to Port Talbot. She made her home at Margam Castle, did not marry, and on 26 September 1918 was buried in the family vault in Margam church.

From a press obituary:

References

1840 births
1918 deaths
20th-century British businesswomen
British railway entrepreneurs
Port Talbot
People from Belgravia
Emily
19th-century Welsh businesspeople
19th-century British businesswomen